Lawless is an American detective television series starring former NFL player Brian Bosworth on the Fox Broadcasting Company that performed so poorly on television it was canceled after one episode.

Premise
The series centers on John Lawless, an ex-special forces operative who became a motorcycle riding private investigator in Miami's South Beach.

Cast
Brian Bosworth  ...  John Lawless 
Glenn Plummer  ...  Reggie   
Janet Hubert  ...  Esther Hayes   
Jay Amor  ...  Manuel Oriba 
Rus Blackwell  ...  Todd 
Oscar Torre  ...  Rico

References

External links
 

1997 American television series debuts
1997 American television series endings
English-language television shows
Fox Broadcasting Company original programming
Television series by Sony Pictures Television
Television shows set in Miami
Television series canceled after one episode
American detective television series